Jean Herly (15 September 1920 – 17 November 1998) was a Minister of State for Monaco. He served between 1981 and 1985.

Biography 
Jean Herly was born in Grosbliederstroff in France, the first of two children. He studied law at the University of Paris, and stayed at the diplomatic school of the French government.

Career 
 Services overseas, 1946–1962
 First Secretary in the Embassy of France to Japan, 1959–1962
 Consul General of France to Germany, location Düsseldorf, 1964–1966
 Ambassador of France to Central African Republic and Chief of the services of the French-speaking in the south of Africa and of the Sahara, 1969–1973
 Ambassador extraordinary and plenipotentiary of France to Israel, location Tel-Aviv, 1973–1977
 Ambassador extraordinary and plenipotentiary of France to Morocco, location Rabat, 1978–1980
 Diplomatic Counselor of the French government, 1980
 Director of African and Madagascan affairs in the French ministry of foreign affairs, 1980–1981
 Minister of State of the Principality of Monaco, 1981–1985
 Ambassador extraordinary and plenipotentiary of His Most Serene Highness the Prince Rainier III of Monaco to Switzerland, location Berne, 1985–1991
 Ambassador extraordinary and plenipotentiary of His Most Serene Highness the Prince Rainier III of Monaco to Germany, location Bonn, 1991–1998
 Death in service as Ambassador extraordinary and plenipotentiary of His Most Serene Highness the Prince Rainier III of Monaco to Germany in 1998, location Bonn.

Awards and honors

French honors
 Commander of the National Order of the Legion of Honour
 Commander of the National Order of Merit
 Recipient of the Colonial Medal
 Officer of the Order of the Arts and the Letters

Monegasque honors
 Grand Officer of the Order of Saint Charles

Foreign honors
:
 Grand-Cross of the Order pro Merito Melitensi
:
 Grand Officer of the Order of Central African Merit
:
 Commander of the National Order of the Lion
:
 Commander of the National Order of the Ivory Coast

Awards
Croix de guerre des théâtres d’opérations extérieures, France

References

Ministers of State of Monaco
1920 births
1998 deaths
Ambassadors of France to the Central African Republic
Ambassadors of France to Israel
Ambassadors of France to Morocco
Ambassadors of Monaco to Switzerland
Ambassadors of Monaco to Germany
Recipients of the Ordre des Arts et des Lettres
Commandeurs of the Légion d'honneur
Commanders of the Ordre national du Mérite
University of Paris alumni